George William Morris (February 24, 1919 – September 13, 1999) was an American football player. He played college football for the Baldwin Wallace University and professional football in the National Football League (NFL) as a halfback for the Cleveland Rams (1941–1942). He appeared in 19 NFL games, four as a starter.

References

1919 births
1999 deaths
American football halfbacks
People from East Palestine, Ohio
Baldwin Wallace Yellow Jackets football players
Cleveland Rams players
Players of American football from Ohio